BuzzFeed Unsolved (also known as simply Unsolved) is a documentary entertainment web series created by Ryan Bergara for BuzzFeed that ran from February 4, 2016, to November 19, 2021. It first appeared on the YouTube channel BuzzFeed Blue and was later given its own flagship channel BuzzFeed Unsolved Network.

The show was split into two alternating themes, with each season seeing Bergara and co-host Shane Madej discussing either unsolved crimes in BuzzFeed Unsolved True Crime or investigating alleged haunted locations and demonic possessions in BuzzFeed Unsolved Supernatural. While the topics of discussion were often morbid, most episodes were presented in a comedic manner, cutting between Bergara's voiceover of the episode's topic and comedic discussion with Madej. The show was filmed primarily in the United States, with some episodes filmed in separate locations in the UK and Mexico. Most episodes were followed by a question and answer episode, entitled BuzzFeed Unsolved Postmortem, where Bergara and Madej answered questions sent in by viewers about the week's episode.

The show became one of BuzzFeed's most watched shows, which led the series to start streaming on Hulu and Amazon Prime in 2018. Prior to the premiere of season 8, BuzzFeed renewed the show for a 9th season, which appeared in late 2018. In 2019, the 10th season premiered in March and the 11th season premiered in September. In late 2019, Bergara and Madej started their own digital production company, Watcher Entertainment, with Worth It's Steven Lim; however, the two continued BuzzFeed Unsolved with a 12th season in March 2020.

BuzzFeed Unsolved True Crime concluded with its 8th and final season in July 2021, and the 7th and final season of BuzzFeed Unsolved Supernatural started in October 2021 and wrapped in November. There are a total of fifteen seasons. Due to the COVID-19 pandemic, Supernatural skipped 2020 and has one less season than True Crime because production was unable to secure haunted locations to visit under quarantine. The final episode was followed up by a behind-the-scenes documentary BuzzFeed Unsolved: The Making of the Final Investigation on 24 November 2021.

The spiritual successor to BuzzFeed Unsolved Supernatural is Ghost Files, a documentary entertainment web series by Watcher Entertainment that was first released on September 23, 2022. The successor to BuzzFeed Unsolved True Crime is Mystery Files, which was announced on March 2, 2023.

Format

Synopsis
BuzzFeed Unsolved True Crime and Supernatural were originally co-hosted by Bergara and Brent Bennett until Madej took over from Bennett in late 2016 due to Bennett no longer having enough time to devote to the show's production.

The show has a dynamic between its co-hosts, with Madej acting as a skeptic against Bergara's theories and belief in ghosts. The contrast between Bergara's belief in conspiracies and the paranormal versus Madej's skepticism provides the majority of the comedic dialogue; however, despite Bergara's strong belief in otherworldly spirits, he shows reluctance towards belief in cryptids such as Bigfoot and aliens, in contrast to Madej, who conversely believes such creatures to be somewhat more realistic or grounded in reality.

"Nightshade" by David O'Brien, which typically plays during the theories section, is considered the series' unofficial theme song.

Production
The episodes were normally filmed with the two hosts at a desk, with Bergara presenting Madej and the audience with either a True Crime or Supernatural case depending on the season, aided with the use of stock photos, live action recreations with guest actors, and other visuals. In some episodes, the hosts and other crew members traveled around to investigate a location(s), although this method was primarily used for the Supernatural episodes; the show's True Crime seasons were typically filmed all within the Unsolved set. Due to the show's growth in popularity, Bergara would work with a number of individuals to propose cases if the show was capable of covering them, while Madej would be kept out of the process to give a more fresh perspective.

BuzzFeed Unsolved True Crime
In the show's True Crime seasons, Bergara focuses on unsolved crimes, particularly well-known cold cases from many years ago. In most episodes, Bergara reads out the story of the case, including evidence the police working on the case used, before presenting a handful of possible suspects and theories, from both the official police reports and the ideas of others, coupled with evidence that can both prove and disprove their involvement. During these cases, Madej will cut in to provide his input, comedic observations, responses, and theories to Bergara, ending the episode with both hosts discussing which theory appears most likely based on the suspects involved.

BuzzFeed Unsolved Supernatural
In the show's Supernatural seasons, Madej and Bergara discuss alleged paranormal entities, hauntings and demons, often seeking evidence of their existence. Most Supernatural seasons include one alien and one demon-themed episode per season. Some episodes, such as the Roanoke colony and Anneliese Michel episodes, are presented at a desk in a format similar to that of True Crime. However, most involve some sort of in-person investigation.

Throughout their investigations of hauntings, both Madej and Bergara use a variety of instruments and equipment to attempt to collect evidence, including video and audio devices. Other BuzzFeed Unsolved: Supernatural episodes investigate supernatural entities and phenomena such as Mothman, Bigfoot and the existence of aliens. The two aim to create an "everyman approach" in discussing the topics, with the use of humor in an effort to balance the tone between dark and goofy.

Guests
In BuzzFeed Unsolved: Supernatural Season 4, Ancient Aliens contributor Giorgio Tsoukalos was featured in the discussion about a potential UFO sighting. A recurring guest on the show in early seasons was the "Vatican approved exorcist" Father Gary Thomas, who discusses his belief in demons and the supernatural. During Postmortem episodes, guest co-hosts would occasionally be brought in. In "BuzzFeed Unsolved: Supernatural" Season 6, YouTuber Loey Lane was featured in the discussion of the strange incidents that had led her to believe her house was being haunted by ghosts.

Hosts

Episodes

BuzzFeed Unsolved – True Crime

Season 1

Season 2

Season 3

Season 4

Season 5

Season 6

Season 7

Season 8

BuzzFeed Unsolved – Supernatural

Season 1

Season 2

Season 3

Season 4

Season 5

Season 6

Season 7

BuzzFeed Unsolved - Sports Conspiracies

Season 1

Spin-offs and specials

Holiday specials

Retrospectives

Documentaries and behind the scenes

Crossovers

In Control With Kelsey - Season 2

Other crossovers

Ending segments 
The "Hot Daga" – a portmanteau of "hot dog" and "saga" – is a recurring absurdist animated segment at the end of some Postmortem episodes that is created, written, and narrated by Madej, and focuses on a cast of anthropomorphized food. The series originated when Madej asked Bergara to animate a skateboarding hot dog graphic at the end of the Postmortem episode "The Boy in the Box - Q+A" in August 2017.

Since Season 5 of True Crime, the end of some Postmortem episodes have included a "Roast Mortem" section where Bergara and Madej review social media posts roasting the content of the corresponding main series episode, or themselves. The segment later changed to "Toast Mortem" to spread positivity during the COVID-19 pandemic. This segment has replaced the Hot Daga, with the last installment of the Hot Daga having appeared in September 2018.

References

External links 

2016 web series debuts
2010s YouTube series
2020s YouTube series
2021 web series endings
American non-fiction web series
BuzzFeed
Documentary television series about crime in the United States
Documentary web series
Mystery web series
Paranormal investigators
True crime
Works about the paranormal
Works impacted by the COVID-19 pandemic